Selim Rusi (1821-1905) was an Albanian patriot who was one of the most prominent activists of the Albanian National Awakening in the late 19th century and early 20th century. He was born in Debar, then part of the Ottoman Empire to a family known for patriotism. In 1899 he represented the Sanjak of Debar at the meeting that established the League of Peja, an organization that aimed at advancing the rights of the Albanians in the Ottoman Empire. Later that year he was one of the leaders of a revolt in the Sanjak of Debar as planned by the League of Peja. Although he failed to organize a meeting of local patriots at Debar, the revolt where he was involved in was a turning point in the struggle of the Albanians for independence.

References

1821 births
1905 deaths
18th-century Albanian people 
19th-century Albanian people
People from Debar
Activists of the Albanian National Awakening